Ulises "Candy" Sierra Pizarro (born March 27, 1967) is a former Major League Baseball right-handed pitcher.

Career
Signed by the San Diego Padres as an amateur free agent in 1983, Sierra would make his Major League Baseball debut with the San Diego Padres on April 6, 1988.  Two months later, he was dealt to the Cincinnati Reds for Dennis Rasmussen, and he appeared in his final big league game on June 10, .

See also
 List of Major League Baseball players from Puerto Rico

External links

Baseball Almanac

1967 births
Living people
Beaumont Golden Gators players
Charlotte Knights players
Chattanooga Lookouts players
Cincinnati Reds players
Las Vegas Stars (baseball) players
Major League Baseball pitchers
Major League Baseball players from Puerto Rico
Nashville Sounds players
People from Río Piedras, Puerto Rico
Reno Padres players
Riverside Red Wave players
San Diego Padres players
Spokane Indians players
Wichita Pilots players